4th New York Film Critics Online Awards
December 11, 2004
The 4th New York Film Critics Online Awards, honoring the best in filmmaking in 2004, were given on 11 December 2004.

Top 9 Films
Sideways
The Aviator
Before Sunset
Ying xiong (Hero)
Kinsey
La mala educación (Bad Education)
The Incredibles
Diarios de motocicleta (The Motorcycle Diaries)
Shi mian mai fu (House of Flying Daggers)

Winners
 Best Actor: Jamie Foxx – Ray
 Best Actress: Imelda Staunton – Vera Drake
 Best Animated Film: The Incredibles
 Best Cinematography: Ying xiong (Hero) – Christopher Doyle
 Best Debut Director: Joshua Marston – Maria Full of Grace
 Best Director: Martin Scorsese – The Aviator 
 Best Documentary: Broadway: The Golden Age and Super Size Me (tie)
 Best Film: Sideways 
 Best Foreign Language Film: Diarios de motocicleta (The Motorcycle Diaries) • United States/Germany/UK/Argentina/Chile/Peru/France
 Best Screenplay: Eternal Sunshine of the Spotless Mind – Charlie Kaufman
 Best Supporting Actor: Thomas Haden Church – Sideways
 Best Supporting Actress: Virginia Madsen – Sideways
 Breakthrough Performer: Topher Grace – P.S. and In Good Company

References

New York Film Critics Online Awards
2004 film awards
2004 in American cinema